Manninen is a Finnish surname. Notable people with the surname include:

Otto Manninen (1872–1950), Finnish writer
Ilmari Manninen (1894–1935), Finnish ethnographer
Mauno Manninen (1915–1969), Finnish theatre director, poet and painter
Uolevi Manninen (1937–2009), Finnish basketball player and businessman
Raimo Manninen (alpine skier) (1940–2009), Finnish alpine skier
Hannes Manninen (born 1946), Finnish politician
Jarmo Manninen (born 1951), Finnish retired football player
Raimo Manninen (athlete) (born 1955), Finnish retired javelin thrower
Hannu Manninen (born 1978), Finnish Nordic combined athlete
Pirjo Manninen (born 1981), Finnish cross country skier
Emilija Manninen (born 1981), Estonian hurdler 
Mikko Manninen (born 1985), Finnish professional football striker
Oskari Manninen (born 1991), Finnish ice hockey player

Finnish-language surnames